The men's middleweight event was part of the boxing programme at the 1972 Summer Olympics. The weight class allowed boxers of up to 75 kilograms to compete. The competition was held from 29 August to 10 September 1972. 22 boxers from 22 nations competed.

Medalists

Results
The following boxers took part in the event:

First round
 Alejandro Montoya (CUB) def. Alec Năstac (ROU), KO-1
 Bill Knight (GBR) def. Julius Luipa (ZAM), 3:2
 Hans-Joachim Brauske (GDR) def. Abdalla Abdelwahb Salih (SUD), 3:2
 Vyacheslav Lemeshev (URS) def. William Gomnies (INA), KO-1
 Nazif Kuran (TUR) def. Athanasios Giannopoulos (GRE), TKO-2
 Nathaniel Knowles (BAH) def. Faustino Quinales (VEN), TKO-1

Second round
 Reima Virtanen (FIN) def. Titus Simba (TNZ), 3:2
 Witold Stachurski (POL) def. Peter Dula (KEN), 4:1
 Prince Amartey (GHA) def. José Luis Espinosa (MEX), 5:0
 Poul Knudsen (DEN) def. William Peets (VIS), 5:0
 Marvin Johnson (USA) def. Ewald Jarmer (FRG), 5:0
 Alejandro Montoya (CUB) def. Bill Knight (GBR), TKO-2
 Vyacheslav Lemeshev (URS) def. Hans-Joachim Brauske (GDR), 5:0
 Nazif Kuran (TUR) def. Nathaniel Knowles (BAH), KO-1

Quarterfinals
 Reima Virtanen (FIN) def. Witold Stachurski (POL), TKO-3
 Prince Amartey (GHA) def. Poul Knudsen (DEN), 3:2
 Marvin Johnson (USA) def. Alejandro Montoya (CUB), 5:0
 Vyacheslav Lemeshev (URS) def. Nazif Kuran (TUR), TKO-2

Semifinals
 Reima Virtanen (FIN) def. Prince Amartey (GHA), 3:2
 Vyacheslav Lemeshev (URS) def. Marvin Johnson (USA), TKO-2

Final
 Vyacheslav Lemeshev (URS) def. Reima Virtanen (FIN), KO-1

References

Middleweight